Yohanna Sidi Kukah is the incumbent monarch of Akulu chiefdom of the Bakulu people in southern Kaduna State, Middle Belt, Nigeria. He is also known by the title Agwom Akulu II.

He was reported by The Cable to have been kidnapped on January 2, 2018, in his home at Anchuna and released after the payment of a ransom 10 days after. He is a younger brother to the bishop of Roman Catholic Diocese of Sokoto, Matthew Hassan Kukah.

References

Nigerian traditional rulers
People from Kaduna State
Year of birth missing (living people)
Living people